Gruen Von Behrens (May 14, 1977 – September 8, 2015) was an American motivational speaker and victim of mouth cancer caused by smokeless tobacco. After his diagnosis and during his multiple treatments, he became nationally known for raising awareness against the dangers of smokeless tobacco use. He was a national spokesman for Oral Health America's National Spit Tobacco Education Program and participated in tobacco awareness campaigns, such as the Campaign for Tobacco-free Kids and  The Truth Campaign.

As part of his efforts, he spoke to high school and junior high school students in all 50 U.S. states and 10 Canadian provinces. In 2010, he testified before a U.S. Senate hearing about the dangers of tobacco in professional sports.

Von Behrens died of mouth cancer at the age of 38.

Early life and education
Von Behrens was born on May 14, 1977, in Mattoon, Illinois, to Tina (Zike) Von Behrens. He grew up in the small town of Stewardson, Illinois. He graduated from Stewardson-Strasburg High School in the class of 1995 and later attended Lake Land College in Mattoon. In his youth, Von Behrens played baseball and wanted to eventually play at the college level. As a teenager, Von Behrens hit .400 for the Stewardson-Strasburg High School Comets and wanted to play for the Chicago Cubs. Ryne Sandberg was his hero. By age 17, he was diagnosed with oral cancer. His battle with cancer forced him to give up his dream of becoming a major league baseball player.

Personal life 
Von Behrens’ cancer went into remission when he was 23. He then married Sara M. Pruemer on April 26, 2008. They had two daughters and continued living in Stewardson, Illinois.

Public life 

Von Behrens was a motivational speaker who devoted part of his life to raising awareness against the dangers of smokeless tobacco use. He traveled across the United States working as a national spokesman for Oral Health America's National Spit Tobacco Education Program. As part of his efforts, he spoke to high school and junior high school children in all 50 states and 10 Canadian provinces. In 2010, he testified before a U.S. Senate hearing about the dangers of tobacco in professional sports. In 2012, Von Behrens testified at a Maryland legislative hearing, urging lawmakers to increase the tobacco tax on cigars and smokeless tobacco to 70%, the same level as the tax rate on cigarettes. He also participated in tobacco awareness campaigns, such as the Campaign for Tobacco-free Kids and The Truth Campaign.

Health and death 

Von Behrens started dipping at age 13  and was diagnosed with mouth cancer by age 17. Von Behrens said the cancer began as a white spot, the size of a pinpoint, on the side of his tongue. He said he did not give it a second thought because white spots are not uncommon among chewing tobacco users, but it did not go away. In one of his interviews, he was quoted as saying that one day, his tongue actually split in half because the cancer was inside the tongue and then split it.
 
He subsequently endured more than forty operations on his face, neck, and mouth, radiation treatments and chemotherapy. Doctors removed half of his tongue muscles and his jaw. They also took out half of his neck muscles. Doctors took sections of healthy skin from his legs and grafted them to his face and neck. Because of radiation treatments, all of his teeth were removed, and at age 19, he had to start using dentures. His lower jaw was replaced with fibula bone from his lower leg. He was left severely disfigured by the surgeries. After a long battle with mouth cancer, Von Behrens died in his home in Stewardson, Illinois, on September 8, 2015, at age 38.

References

External links

1977 births
2015 deaths
American motivational speakers
Deaths from oral cancer
Deaths from cancer in Illinois
Anti-smoking activists